The women's 200 metres event at the 2006 African Championships in Athletics was held at the Stade Germain Comarmond on August 12–13.

Medalists

Results

Heats
Wind: Heat 1: -3.9 m/s, Heat 2: -1.6 m/s, Heat 3: -2.7 m/s

Final
Wind: -2.6 m/s

References
Results 

2006 African Championships in Athletics
200 metres at the African Championships in Athletics
2006 in women's athletics